Rublev is a Russian surname Рублёв (Rublyov). Notable people with the surname include:

 Andrei Rublev, Russian icon painter
 Andrey Rublev (born 1997), Russian tennis player

See also
 Andrei Rublev (film)
 Rubley

Russian-language surnames